Lygropia yerburii is a moth in the family Crambidae. It was described by Arthur Gardiner Butler in 1886. It is found in Pakistan, Korea and Japan.

The wingspan is about 15 mm.

Subspecies
Lygropia yerburii yerburii
Lygropia yerburii nipponica Inoue, 1986 (Japan)

References

Moths described in 1886
Lygropia